Gymnastics at the 2015 European Youth Summer Olympic Festival took place from 28 July to 1 August in Tbilisi, Georgia in the Gymnastics Palace.

Medal summary

Medal table

Overall

Boys

Girls

Medal events

Boys

Girls

References

European Youth Summer Olympic Festival
2015 European Youth Summer Olympic Festival
Gymnastics in Georgia (country)
2015